Sia Partners is a management consulting firm that serves the following industries: banking, insurance, healthcare, telecommunications and media, energy, resources and utilities, transportation and logistics, industry and retail, government, and technology. The firm is totally independent from providers of software and audit firms.

The group has an international presence with 40 offices across 19 countries, and counts 2,800 consultants with a projected revenue of US$435 million (2022/2023). Sia Partners is run by an international management team and organized as a partnership.

History 
Co-founded in 1999 by Matthieu Courtecuisse (who graduated from ENSAE ParisTech in 1995), the firm started out in Paris in the financial services industry before developing expertise in other industries including: energy, telecommunications and media, transportation and logistics, manufacturing, government, actuarial sciences and CRM.

The firm established offices in Belgium (in Brussels since 2006), Italy (Rome and Milan since 2006) and Morocco (in Casablanca since 2007).

In September 2008, Sia Partners acquired EDS Consulting Services France (formerly AT Kearney Interactive), a firm of 20 consultants. Prior to this, the American information technology group Hewlett-Packard (HP) had acquired the computer engineering services arm of EDS (Electronic Data Systems).

In November 2010, Sia Partners acquired the company Axelboss, the management consulting arm of the company Valtech. This increased the firm's headcount from around 30 to almost 300 (50 of whom located in five foreign cities).

In August 2012, Sia Partners acquired OTC Americas, the New York branch of the OTC Conseil group. This acquisition aimed at reinforcing the firm's international presence and proximity to investment banks. This international expansion was reinforced in October 2012, when the previously established companies Sia Conseil France and Sia Conseil Maroc changed their names to the international brand name Sia Partners.

In September 2013, Sia Partners announced the acquisition of the international management consulting arm of the Investance group, a management consultancy and services company in the finance industry. This acquisition brought with it 60 consultants and three new sites: London (20 consultants), Hong Kong and Singapore (20 consultants). It also led to the Sia Partners team in New York doubling in size to reach 40 consultants.

In February 2014, Sia Partners strengthened its procurement services offering through the acquisition of the firm Sourcing France (formerly Factea France) In August 2014, Sia Partners opened a second North American office in North America, in Montreal in Canada. In April 2015, it opened its third office in Asia, in Tokyo in Japan. Sia Partners's third North American office, in Charlotte, North Carolina, opened in October 2015.

Sia Partners announced an annual growth in activity by almost 30%. Courtecuisse expects this trend to continue (notably in the U.S., where the firm has just purchased an office space in Manhattan's Financial District), and is looking to the west coast for future expansion.

In September 2016, Sia Partners announced the acquisition of Molten Group, a consulting firm based in London and Houston, TX, with a specialization in transformation and the oil and gas industry.

In 2017 the investment fund Studio was started. The fund aims to invest 5 million euros in select start-ups over the next three years.  Studio's portfolio has included the following startups: Big Moustache (January 2017), a French e-commerce site for men's shaving products; Livsty (December 2017), a simple and innovative equity release platform; Cleep (April 2018), a social media platform intent on simplifying online shopping; Lettria (December 2018), a natural language processing (NLP) tool centered on the French language; and SPARTED (February 2019), an HR-Tech SaaS startup with a mobile training platform. Happydemics (December 2020), Greenly (July 2021)  and METAV.RS (September 2022) 

In May 2018, Sia Partners acquired the French digital marketing agency, FOVE.

September 2018 saw two acquisitions in the UK: Inzenka, specialised in growth and innovation consultancy, and SKT Consulting, which concentrates on regulatory consulting for wealth management and corporate banking. Together, the firms bring the Sia Partners' UK headcount to 80 partners and consultants.

In March 2019, Sia Partners acquired Loft9 Consulting in the US. Based in Seattle and Denver, establishing the group's presence on the US West Coast and increasing its activities in the Tech, Healthcare, Utilities, and Airline industries.

In May 2019, Sia Partners announced the acquisition of the Gartland and Mellina Group ("GMG"), a management consulting firm in the US focused on financial services. The firm is based in New York, with additional offices in Chicago, Baltimore, and Toronto.

In July 2019, the group launched its affiliate program with the goal of accelerating brand deployment in Latin America, Sub-Saharan Africa, and Asia. Based in Panama City, the firm RTP (now Sia Partners Panama) is the first member of the Sia Partners network.

In November 2019, Sia Partners acquired Caiman Consulting, a management consulting firm in the US, focused on Tech. With offices in Seattle and The Bay Area, the transaction led to new Sia Partners offices in San Jose and San Francisco, California.

In July 2020, Sia Partners acquired Pathfinder, a management consulting firm specialized in "Change and Transformation". With offices in Dublin and Edinburgh, the transaction strengthened Sia Partners' presence in Ireland and the UK.

In December 2020, Sia Partners expands its presence in Canada with the acquisition of RG Advisory, a Toronto-based firm specializing in financial services.

In April 2021, Sia Partners expanded its activities in France, exceeding 1,000 employees, with the acquisition of USIDE, a consulting firm specializing in corporate behavior and quality of work life.

In April and June 2021, Sia Partners expanded its activities in France by opening offices in Nantes and Marseille.

In 2021, Sia Partners acquired Ethier, a consulting firm based in Calgary, Canada, and Summus Group, a consulting firm based in Charlotte in North Carolina. Following the acquisition of Summus, Sia Partners announces the creation of a new office in Atlanta.**

Sia Partners also acquired PPT Consulting a Management and IT Consulting firm based in Philadelphia. 

In 2022, Sia Partners embraces emerging technologies by developing its capabilities around the Metaverse, and virtual and extended reality.

In early 2022, Sia Partners acquired Paris-based Fintech firm, Stratumn, on behalf of its AI branch, Heka.

Over the summer, Sia Partners acquired Perth, Australia-based consulting firm, Churchill Consulting, allowing the firm to expand capabilities in mining and energy. Later in 2022, Sia Partners acquired Edmonton, Canada-based boutique consulting firm, E2E.

References

External links 
 "Sia Partners refreshes branding for new growth phase"

 Risalat Consultants

International management consulting firms
Management consulting firms of France
Companies based in Paris